The enzyme glycerol-2-phosphatase (EC 3.1.3.19) catalyzes the reaction

glycerol 2-phosphate + H2O  glycerol + phosphate

This enzyme belongs to the family of hydrolases, specifically those acting on phosphoric monoester bonds.  The systematic name is glycerol-2-phosphate phosphohydrolase. Other names in common use include β-glycerophosphatase, β-glycerophosphate phosphatase, and 2-glycerophosphatase.

References

 Boyer, P.D., Lardy, H. and Myrback, K. (Eds.), The Enzymes, 2nd ed., vol. 5, Academic Press, New York, 1961, p. 37-47.
 

EC 3.1.3
Enzymes of unknown structure